Class President is a 1990 children's picture book written by American author Johanna Hurwitz and illustrated by Sheila Hamanaka.

References

1990 children's books
American picture books